A shake is an informal metric unit of time equal to 10 nanoseconds, or 10−8 seconds. It was originally coined for use in nuclear physics, helping to conveniently express the timing of various events in a nuclear reaction, especially neutron reactions.

Etymology
Like many informal units having to do with nuclear physics, it arose from top secret operations of the Manhattan Project during World War II. The word "shake" was taken from the idiomatic expression "in two shakes of a lamb's tail", which indicates a very short time interval.

Lexicographers have discussed at length that the oldest documented usage of the phrase "two shakes of a lamb's tail" found first (so far) in the works of Richard Barham ; however, the phrase almost certainly was part of vernacular language long before then.

Nuclear physics
For nuclear-bomb designers, the term was a convenient name for the short interval, rounded to 10 nanoseconds, which was frequently seen in their measurements and calculations:
The typical time required for one step in a chain reaction (i.e. the typical time for each neutron to cause a fission event, which releases more neutrons) is of the order of 1 shake, and a chain reaction is typically complete by 50 to 100 shakes.

Integrated circuitry 
Shakes are also applicable to circuits. Since signal progression in IC chips is very rapid, on the order of nanoseconds, a shake is good measure of how quickly a signal can progress through an integrated circuit (IC).

See also 
 ‘Barn’ a companion unit of cross-sectional area created by the same people, for the same general purposes, at the same time (the measured value of nuclear-reaction cross section was larger than expected, hence deemed “as big as a barn”).
 List of humorous units of measurement

References 

Units of time